Stephen Percy Harris (born 12 March 1956) is an English musician who is the bassist, keyboardist, backing vocalist, primary songwriter and founder/leader of heavy metal band Iron Maiden. He has been the band's only constant member since their inception in 1975 and, along with guitarist Dave Murray, the only member to appear on every album.

Harris has a recognisable and popular style of bass playing, particularly the "gallop" which can be found on many Iron Maiden recordings, such as the singles "Run to the Hills" and "The Trooper". In addition to his role as the band's bass player, writer and backing vocalist, he has undertaken many other roles for the group, such as producing and co-producing their albums, directing and editing their live videos and performing studio keyboards and synthesizers. He has been cited as one of the greatest heavy metal bassists.

In 2012, Harris released his debut solo album, British Lion, which was followed by The Burning in 2020.

Early life
Harris was born on 12 March 1956 at Whipps Cross University Hospital, in Leytonstone, then part of Essex, where he grew up aspiring to be a professional footballer. Scouted by Wally St Pier, Harris was asked to train for West Ham United. After gaining an interest in rock music in his early teens, he realised that he no longer desired to play football professionally. In particular, he was greatly influenced by the Beatles. Harris attended Leyton Senior High School for Boys (now Leyton Sixth Form College) where he studied architecture.

Initially Harris wanted to play drums, but did not have enough space for a drum kit in his house and so decided on the bass instead. Entirely self-taught, his first bass was a copy of a Fender Precision model which cost him £40 in 1971.

Just ten months after he bought his first bass, Harris joined a band, initially known as Influence and later Gypsy's Kiss, featuring Bob Verscoyle (lead vocals), Dave Smith (guitar) and drummer Paul Sears. After a short number of gigs at the Cart and Horses pub in Maryland Point, Stratford and the Bridgehouse in Canning Town, the band split up and Harris auditioned for a band called Smiler in February 1974. In this outfit, Harris began writing his own songs and worked with future Iron Maiden members Dennis Wilcock and Doug Sampson, but left the band after they refused to play his material, claiming it was too complicated.

Career

Iron Maiden 

Upon leaving Smiler, Harris went on to create Iron Maiden on Christmas Day 1975, with the band's name being inspired by the film The Man in the Iron Mask. Before Iron Maiden signed their contract with EMI in 1979, Harris worked as an architectural draughtsman in the East End of London until he was made redundant, at which point he undertook a job as a street sweeper.

Since their inception, Harris has been the band's principal composer and lyricist. His songwriting typically showcases his trademark galloping bass patterns, which features heavily in songs such as "The Trooper" and "Run to the Hills", and his progressive rock-influenced time changes. Later, Harris' songs became more progressive, and guitarist Adrian Smith has commented that Harris now prefers contributing "lyrics and melodies and arranging" to other member's songs over writing alone. Harris frequently writes lyrics about mythology, history or topics inspired from books and films, reflecting his interests and progressive rock influences.

British Lion

In September 2012, Harris released his first solo album, British Lion. Originating with a band, named British Lion, which he managed and wrote with in the early 1990s, Harris kept in touch with its vocalist, Richard Taylor, and guitarist, Graham Leslie, and the album, consisting of 1970s influenced hard rock songs, was written and recorded over a number of years around Iron Maiden's tour schedule. Speaking to Kerrang! in September 2012, Harris stated that he considers the record to be "more of a side-project" than a solo album, as he is more "comfortable in a band environment."

In an interview with Classic Rock in August, Harris stated that he will be releasing more solo albums and hopes to tour with the band in the future. Harris has taken the outfit on two separate European club tours in 2013 and 2014, with an additional tour taking place in 2016. On 2 September 2016, Harris announced that he intends to issue a live album recorded at shows from across the three tours.

Their second album, titled The Burning, was released on 17 January 2020.

Personal life

Harris' eldest daughter, Lauren, is a singer and classically trained actor who supported Iron Maiden with her solo outfit in 2006 and 2008. In 2008, she released a solo album, entitled Calm Before the Storm, and is currently a member of a band called Kingdom of I, after forming Six Hour Sundown. In addition, Harris' oldest son, George, plays guitar in a band, the Raven Age, who were the opening act on Iron Maiden's The Book of Souls World Tour in 2016, and also in the Legacy of the beast tour 2019. His second-oldest daughter, Kerry, works as a Production Assistant for Iron Maiden while his third-oldest daughter, Faye, is a fashion writer for HuffPost.

In 1993, Harris was divorced from his wife, psychotherapist Lorraine Jury, whom he met 16 years previously. He later said this was "probably the toughest time I've ever faced," and the changes in his personal life are credited with inspiring the mood of the following Iron Maiden album, 1995's The X Factor. Harris has four children with Lorraine: Lauren, Kerry, Faye and George, and two children with current partner Emma.

Since the 1980s, Harris has owned a Grade II listed building in Sheering, Essex, in the grounds of which he built his own recording and editing studio, "Barnyard". In November 2012, the nine-acre property was put on sale. The Property was sold in March 2022 having been on the market for a number of years for £3,950,000. Harris now lives primarily in the Bahamas.

A keen footballer, Harris played for amateur clubs as a child and was later scouted by Wally St Pier and asked to train for West Ham United, of whom he has been a fan since he was 9 years old. Although he had aspired to play professionally up to that point, Harris would eventually realise that "it wasn't really what [he] wanted to do." Nevertheless, Harris still plays football regularly with his own team, "Maidonians", and still supports West Ham, staying in contact with the club and having their crest on his most-used Precision Bass. Harris also plays tennis, and is a photographer.

Musical style

Technique
Harris is often considered among the best and most influential heavy metal bassists. He is most known for his "galloping" playing style: usually an eighth note followed by two sixteenth notes at fast tempo (e.g., "The Trooper" and "Run to the Hills") or eighth note triplets, which he plays with two fingers, rather than using a plectrum. Before playing, Harris often chalks his fingers, to make these fast patterns easier to play, as shown on the bonus DVD for the A Matter of Life and Death album. Harris's playing is often unusually prominent in the mix on Iron Maiden's recordings; he generally uses a tone with a treble-heavy EQ and compression to accentuate the attack on the strings. Iron Maiden guitarist Janick Gers has commented that "Steve taught himself in a way that nobody can really copy it. People say it's like a lead guitar, but it's not. It gives the band a basis and it moves around quite a lot, but it's the tone that he has. Steve has a way of hearing things and a tone that isn't normally associated with a bass, it's more like a rhythm guitar."

Influences

Harris was influenced by the progressive rock bands of the 1970s, as well as early hard rock and heavy metal bands. His influences include Black Sabbath, Deep Purple, Emerson, Lake & Palmer, Genesis, Jethro Tull, Led Zeppelin, Golden Earring, Pink Floyd, Thin Lizzy, UFO, Uriah Heep, Wishbone Ash, and Yes. Speaking about the early Iron Maiden sound, Steve Harris described the band as using twin-guitar harmonies inspired by Wishbone Ash and Thin Lizzy, complex time and mood changes from Genesis and Jethro Tull, and the dark melodic elements of Black Sabbath, Deep Purple, and Led Zeppelin. Harris' bass playing was influenced by Yes's Chris Squire and UFO's Pete Way, among others.

Equipment
Since Iron Maiden's beginning to the present day, Harris plays a specially-painted Fender Precision Bass, featured on every Iron Maiden album, which has gone through a total of four colour changes since he began using it. Originally white, it was then changed to black prior to the band's first album, followed by blue sparkle and finally white with claret and blue pinstriping with the West Ham United F.C. crest. Harris has had his bass modified to include a mirrored scratchplate, Badass bridges and Seymour Duncan custom Steve Harris Signature SPB-4 pickups and uses his own signature set of RotoSound flatwound strings. In 2009, Fender issued a signature Steve Harris Precision bass, featuring an alder body, a blue-sparkle finish, mirrored scratchplate, Seymour Duncan SPB-1 pickups and a Badass II bridge. In 2015, Fender released a revised model of the signature bass, which now features a maple body, a white finish with blue pinstripes and the West Ham crest, a Fender High Mass bridge and a Seymour Duncan SPB-4 Steve Harris signature pickup, with the pickup also being sold separately.

In 2005, Metal Hammer reported that he uses eight 4x12" Marshall cabinets with Trace Elliot amplifiers. He also uses four Sony WRT 27 wireless transmitters, allowing him to be as mobile as possible on stage. His signal chain in 2000 also included a Trace Elliot preamp and a DBX compressor.

Other interests and talents
In addition to playing bass and writing music/lyrics for the band, Steve Harris has taken on numerous other roles, such as:
 music production/mixing
 music video directing/editing
 live video directing/editing
 keyboards
 backing vocals
 string/bass synthesizers

Although he performed keyboards on Seventh Son of a Seventh Son, along with guitarist Adrian Smith, in 1988, Harris only began regularly contributing keyboards to Iron Maiden's studio albums from Virtual XI onwards. Until Virtual XI, Michael Kenney, Harris' bass technician, had provided the keyboards from 1990's No Prayer for the Dying onwards, and still does so live and acts as a supervisor in the studio. Along with Smith and guitarist Dave Murray, Harris experimented with synthesizers on the Somewhere in Time and Seventh Son of a Seventh Son albums, using bass synth on Somewhere in Time, and performing "string synth" keyboards on Seventh Son of a Seventh Son.

Steve Harris is also known for playing an increasing role in mixing the band's albums and produced most of their 1990's output, with recording taking place at a studio he owned at the time, located in a barn on his property, named "Barnyard Studios". Since 2000's Brave New World, at Bruce Dickinson's insistence, the band did not record again at Barnyard, which Dickinson claims had limitations due to its size, and hired Kevin Shirley, with whom Harris co-produces.

Harris also directs and edits many of the band's live videos, beginning with Maiden England in 1989. Although not intending to himself, Harris edited the Rock in Rio DVD as he was unsatisfied with the results produced by the band's hired production crew. In undertaking the project, Harris had to teach himself how to use digital editing software with equipment he had installed in Barnyard Studios, and went on to edit Iron Maiden's next DVD, Death on the Road. On top of this, he has contributed to the production of thirteen of the band's music videos, with "Infinite Dreams", "Holy Smoke", "Tailgunner" and "Bring Your Daughter... to the Slaughter" being directed and edited by Harris alone.

Discography

Iron Maiden

Iron Maiden (1980)
Killers (1981)
The Number of the Beast (1982)
Piece of Mind (1983)
Powerslave (1984)
Somewhere in Time (1986)
Seventh Son of a Seventh Son (1988)
No Prayer for the Dying (1990)
Fear of the Dark (1992)
The X Factor (1995)
Virtual XI (1998)
Brave New World (2000)
Dance of Death (2003)
A Matter of Life and Death (2006)
The Final Frontier (2010)
The Book of Souls (2015)
Senjutsu (2021)

Steve Harris' British Lion
British Lion (2012)
The Burning (2020)

Lauren Harris
Calm Before the Storm (2008)

Deeds
Blown (Producer, 2002)

References

Literature

External links 

 
 

1956 births
Living people
Iron Maiden members
English heavy metal bass guitarists
English rock bass guitarists
Male bass guitarists
English male singers
English heavy metal singers
People from Leytonstone
Musicians from London
Waysted members